Auxotricha ochrogypsa is a moth in the family Elachistidae or Oechophoridae, and the only species in the genus Auxotricha. It was described by Edward Meyrick in 1931 from 3 specimens. It is found in the Iquitos region of Peru.

References

Moths described in 1931
Parametriotinae
Taxa named by Edward Meyrick
Moth genera
Fauna of Peru
Moths of South America